XHKG-TDT is a television station in Tepic, Nayarit, Mexico. XHKG broadcasts on virtual channel 4.1 (physical channel 36) and is currently an independent station.

History
XHKG signed on the air, initially on channel 10, on October 12, 1968. It was the first television station in Nayarit, signing on in time to provide television coverage of the 1968 Summer Olympics. The station, which later moved from channel 10 to 2, was owned by Roberto Mondragón González. Originally serving as a full-time repeater of Televisa national programming, it began broadcasting local programming in 1984. Roberto Mondragón and his son died in the 1985 Mexico City earthquake, while staying in the Hotel Regis; as a result, the concession was transferred to his wife, Lucía Pérez Medina.

In 2016, XHKG was forced to move to virtual channel 4.1 as the result of channel 2 nationally being reserved for the Las Estrellas network.
XHKG maintained a partnership with Televisa and carried programming from its Gala TV network and FOROtv, even though it was listed as carrying no Televisa programming in 2014, sparing the station from being defined as within the "preponderant economic agent" in broadcasting for regulatory purposes. Televisa programming was removed from XHKG in 2017 and 2018 after Televisa multiplexed Gala TV on its own transmitter in Tepic.

Programming

Since the first edition on May 27, 1989, XHKG has presented Al Momento local newscasts. The station also produces a variety of non-news local programs.

References

Television stations in Nayarit
Television channels and stations established in 1968
1968 establishments in Mexico
Independent television stations in Mexico